Melka Chireti is a town in southeastern Ethiopia.

Overview
The NGO Médecins Sans Frontières operates a clinic in Melka Chireti.

Demographics
This woreda is primarily inhabited by the Somali. 

Based on figures from the Central Statistical Agency in 2005, Melka Chireti has an estimated total population of 8,903, of whom 4,841 were men and 4,062 were women. The 1997 national census reported a total population for this town of 5,967, of whom 3,198 were men and 2,769 were women. The predominant ethnic group reported in Melka Chireti was the Somali (99.64% of the population). It is the largest town in Chereti woreda.

Major towns in Chereti include Ara-arba, Gurro, Habal-alan, Ducanle, and Janale.

Notes 

Populated places in the Somali Region